Dance Central 2 is a music rhythm game for the Xbox 360 and is the sequel to Dance Central. It was released in October 2011.

Plot
Dr. Tan is monitoring the status of the area in The Airship, laughing while doing so.

The player first meets up with Riptide Crew at the High Tide, and when they arrive, Emilia rejects and discloses to them that auditions to be in their crew were last week. Bodie however gives them an opportunity after hearing about the player's potential, and Emilia soon follows forth. Once they are impressed, the player receives their crew card, but not without a warning from Bodie stating that other crews exist nearby, with some of them being unfriendly.

Flash4wrd is the next crew they meet, and they appear at the Tee Off. Taye recognizes the player as being the one Bodie mentioned to them earlier while Li'l T compliments their style. They both then give the player the chance, and once the player completes their set of challenges, Li'l T saws how hot their dancing was, but Taye on the other hand questions if their dancing will be hot enough to take on The Glitterati. Li'l T immediately responds fearlessly and describes them as "two pale primadonnas living in a skyscraper" but Taye dismisses that statement by challenging her to say it again at night without a nightlight. After, Taye gives the player their crew card and reminds them to stay focused while staying true to themselves.

Lu$h Crew is next on deck, appearing on Set Adrift. Angel mistakes the player for wanting to party, while Miss Aubrey corrects him as someone everyone is gushing over. When the player completes their tasks, Miss Aubrey formally welcomes them into their crew. Angel uses this as an opportunity to flirt with Miss Aubrey, only for her to quickly shut it down. He then gives the player their crew card.

Hi-Def becomes the next crew the player interacts with. Appearing on Lowdown, Mo and Glitch are talking to each other when Glitch notices the player from behind and mistakes them for being a spy for The Glitterati. Mo does not think that to be the case and simply sees the player as someone who would like to dance with them. When Hi-Def's challenges are completed, Glitch is stunned and compares their dancing to Mo's, but quickly retracts it to Mo when he is not trying. Mo then allows them to rep for their crew as a way to deny The Glitterati from stealing their style, and gives the player their crew card.

After those four crews are met, The Glitterati becomes the fifth crew the player encounters. Up at Penthaüs, Jaryn gives a short introduction before quickly doubting the player's talent. Kerith however overrules that statement and gives the player a chance to dance with them. When The Glitterati's goals are met, they comment on how underestimated they thought their talent was and allow them to rep for their crew, with Jaryn throwing their crew card once they do.

Once those five crews are met, the player is taken to Dr. Tan in The Airship. He states that he knew that the player would come to his airship eventually, and explains his knowledge of the player by displaying them on the screens, exposing that he was monitoring their every move. He then introduces the player to D-Cypher, a crew he ensures will not be defeated, to battle the player with the goal of conquering them so that he could take over the dancing world.

Failure to beat any crew's final challenge song with 4 stars or higher, and any song from D-Cypher's crew challenge with 4 stars or higher will result in the crew telling the player(s) to brush up and break it down to start all over again (or in the Glitterati crew's and D-Cypher crew's case, mock you for failing the song).

When the player beats D-Cypher, The Airship turns into chaos, with D-Cypher shutting off, and the screens behind starting to fall off. Enraged, Dr. Tan gives a lengthy statement on how he will not give up, pushes a button on his control pad, and escapes the room, giving a hysterical laugh once doing so.

Gameplay

The core gameplay in Dance Central 2 is similar to the first one where players mimic characters along on-screen with flashcards there for guidance. The game has been largely revamped compared to its predecessors, including the ability to allow two players to dance side by side, adding voice commands, and enhancing the Break It Down feature. The Freestyle section, while still available, can also be disabled within the game. If done, additional moves will appear in the game as a replacement, creating one uninterrupted routine depending on the mode used. Songs from Dance Central 1 will always have the Freestyle section enabled, regardless of setting. Crew Challenge is the story mode implemented in the game. It involves the player earning the ability to rep crews throughout the area while underlyingly trying to defeat Dr. Tan from taking over the dancing population.

There are five modes available in Dance Central 2:

Perform It: Gives players a chance to show off their moves and skills while performing a dance routine. This mode can be played with one or two players and allows a person to swap in and out while the other is playing if desired. Both players do not have to play the same difficulty, but the difficulty must be set prior to the routine starting.

Dance Battle: A head-to-head mode between two players to see who is the best. Players go through a song, with two interloops mixed in. One of them focuses on one player doing the routine as the other player is temporarily disabled, and the other involves the players nailing moves from the routine to earn extra points. In that interloop, up to four moves can pop up at any time, and some are marked in gold, indicating more points. Likewise in Perform It, the players do not have to play on the same difficulty.

Break It Down: A training mode that allows the player to learn the routines in the game. The mode has been enhanced from the previous game, allowing the player to pick certain moves to focus on and record themselves dancing to moves to compare how well they are at acing them.

Crew Challenge: A campaign mode that gives a player a chance to reach for the top by impressing the game's in dance crews. Successfully dancing to each crew's challenge song, once unlocking it, gives the player the opportunity to represent them, and the more reps earned, the higher the notability will be.

Fitness: A workout mode that tracks calories, with an indicator of how many have been burned along with the amount of time spent in the mode towards the top when enabled. There are also pre-made playlists available, along with customizable ones that can be made outside the mode for use in Fitness.

Most characters feature alternative outfits separate from the main outfits (known as their "Crew Look") to wear during gameplay. These alternative outfits are labeled as "Street Style", and are unlocked by earning 36 stars within the character's selection of songs from the crew they are a part of within Crew Challenge mode on any difficulty. Additionally, some characters have a third outfit labeled "DC Classic". These outfits are ones they wore in the previous game, and they are unlocked by putting in cheat codes for the game in the "Redeem Code" section.

The game features six venues (High Tide, Set Adrift, Tee Off, Lowdown, Penthaüs, and The Airship) for the player to dance in. All except one are available from the start. Venues can be changed before the player starts a routine.

Characters
Dance Central 2 features eighteen characters, each divided up into pairs as a crew. Twelve characters are available from the start, while the other six are locked.

Riptide Crew - Emilia and Bodie

Flash4wrd - Taye and Li'l T.

Lu$h Crew - Miss Aubrey and Angel

Hi-Def - Mo and Glitch

The Glitterati - Kerith and Jaryn

D-Cypher - CYPH-78 and CYPH-56

D-Cypher Elite - Dr. Tan and CYPH-ELITE

Ninja Crew - Shinju and Kichi

Icon Crew - Marcos and Frenchy

Soundtrack

Songs
Dance Central 2 comes with an all-new list of songs from different artists both old and new. The songs are color-coded based on the default crew that is associated with that song. However, the songs in light blue are songs are the final challenge songs in the Crew Challenge mode. In said mode, each of the crews' final challenge songs are locked at first, needing a total of 16 stars each from the crews' other songs to unlock their final challenge song. Once you do, they must be passed with 4 stars or higher in order to proceed to the next crew. All of the final challenge songs from each crew are used in D-Cypher's crew challenge at the end. There are 44 songs in the game.

Importing

Songs from the first Dance Central, including its downloadable content, can be played on this game using an importing technique. Downloadable content will automatically appear in the game if it has been purchased already, but the on-disc songs can be moved in using an Import Pack. This is done by retrieving the code from the first game's manual, which is then put in through the "Redeem Code" section of the game that will then prompt the player to download it. In order to download it, it costs $5,00 and requires an Xbox Live gamertag. Once downloaded, they are available to play within Dance Central 2, and they also receive Mo's "DC Classic" outfit as a bonus. Only the actual songs get transferred, associated scores do not. Additionally, the freestyle section is still embedded; disabling the feature will not disable the section within those songs. The list of songs, and its downloadable content, can be seen here.

Importing the original Dance Central songs has since been disabled. Players who have not imported them do not have the option to anymore, but if the players have, they can still access them in the game.

Downloadable content

Dance Central 2 features more downloadable content (DLC) on the Xbox Live Market for 240 Microsoft points. All downloadable and in-game from the original Dance Central are forward compatible with Dance Central 2. Any new DLC after Dance Central 2's release are only compatible with Dance Central 2 and 3. Songs are available for 240 MSP (US$3,00).

No longer available for purchase.

Development

Shortly after the release of Dance Central, the pre-production of the game had been already started. Harmonix planned to observe the sales of Dance Central, which would help determine whether the development on the full version should start.

Dance Central 2 was officially announced at E3 2011 during Microsoft's press conference. It was announced on February 2, 2012 that if the community reaches certain milestones, like star count or calories burned, three new crews and two new outfits will be unlocked. As of April 30, 2012, all the crews and outfits have been unlocked.

Reception

The game have received generally positive reviews. IGN praised the game's style, added multiplayer, and dances, but mentioned how a lot of the dances feel quite feminine, and how there is no shuffle mode. As of August 2016, the game has sold 2.04 million copies worldwide.

References

External links
 

2011 video games
Dance video games
Kinect games
Music video games
Video game sequels
Video games developed in the United States
Xbox 360 games
Xbox 360-only games
Harmonix games